Milenko Vukčević (born 14 September 1966) is a former Yugoslav footballer.

Club career
Born in Tuzla, SR Bosnia and Herzegovina, he played with NK Šparta Beli Manastir from 1983 to 1988. Then he played with Croatian side NK Osijek in the Yugoslav First League between 1988 and 1991. Then he played for Brüttisellen in Switzerland. After Brüttisellen, he moved to Serbia and played with FK Spartak Subotica in the 1992–93 First League of FR Yugoslavia. 

In 1993, he moves to Sweden where he plays with Degerfors IF in two spells, first between 1993 and 1996, and second in the season 1997–98. In between he played with Viborg FF in the 1996–97 Danish Superliga.

He then played in Germany with SV Waldhof Mannheim and back in Sweden with lower-league side Motala AIF. He also played one game with Ljungskile SK in the 2006 Superettan.

References

1966 births
Living people
Sportspeople from Tuzla
Association football midfielders
Yugoslav footballers
Bosnia and Herzegovina footballers
NK Osijek players
FK Spartak Subotica players
Degerfors IF players
Viborg FF players
SV Waldhof Mannheim players
Motala AIF players
Ljungskile SK players
Yugoslav First League players
Allsvenskan players
Superettan players
Danish Superliga players
Bosnia and Herzegovina expatriate footballers
Expatriate footballers in Sweden
Bosnia and Herzegovina expatriate sportspeople in Sweden
Expatriate men's footballers in Denmark
Bosnia and Herzegovina expatriate sportspeople in Denmark
Expatriate footballers in Germany
Bosnia and Herzegovina expatriate sportspeople in Germany